Zito André Sebastião Luvumbo (born 9 March 2002) is an Angolan footballer who plays as a right winger for Italian club Cagliari.

Club career
Born in Luanda, Luvumbo began his career with Primeiro de Agosto, and underwent a trial with English club Manchester United's academy in February 2019. He was also linked with a transfer to English club West Ham United.

On 23 September 2020, he signed a 5-year contract with Italian Serie A club Cagliari.

On 27 July 2021, he moved to Como on a season-long loan.

International career
Luvumbo played for Angola under-17s, and received his first-call up to the senior team in August 2019. In September 2019, he made his debut with the Angola national football team in the 0–1 away win against Gambia.

References

2002 births
Living people
Angolan footballers
Angola youth international footballers
Angola international footballers
Association football wingers
C.D. Primeiro de Agosto players
Cagliari Calcio players
Como 1907 players
Girabola players
Serie B players
Angolan expatriate footballers
Expatriate footballers in Italy
Angolan expatriate sportspeople in Italy